Baladiyah al-Hayir, officially the Al-Hayir Sub-Municipality is a baladiyah and one of the 14 municipalities of Riyadh, Saudi Arabia. It includes 5 neighborhoods and is responsible for their planning, maintenance and development.

Neighborhoods and districts 

 Al-Ghanamiyah
 Al-Hayir
 Al-Arayiz
 Umm Shaʼal
 Al-Sidrah

References 

Hayir